Mian Bazur (also Romanized as Mīān Bāzūr; also known as Mīān Bāzū) is a village in Bedevostan-e Sharqi Rural District, in the Central District of Heris County, East Azerbaijan Province, Iran. At the 2006 census, its population was 80, in 14 families.

References 

Populated places in Heris County